is a private junior college in the city of Ichinomiya in Aichi Prefecture, Japan. It was established in 2004.

External links
 Official website 

Educational institutions established in 2004
Private universities and colleges in Japan
Japanese junior colleges
Universities and colleges in Aichi Prefecture
Nursing schools in Japan
2004 establishments in Japan